The climate of Ecuador is tropical and varies with altitude and region, due to differences in elevation and, to a degree, in proximity to the equator.

Coastal areas are affected by ocean currents and are hot and rainy between January and April. 

The weather in Quito is consistent with that of a subtropical highland climate. There are two seasons in the city: dry and wet. The dry season runs from June to September and the wet season is from October to May.

Effects of Climate Change 

Ecuador has a diverse geography and is very vulnerable to climate change. Antisana, Cotopaxi, Chimborazo, Cayambe, the Ilinizas (north and south), El Altar, and Carihuairazo are the seven glaciers of Ecuador. These glaciers are all located on volcanic craters that are affected by the greenhouse effect. Because of global warming glacier Carihuairazo has already lost 96% of its glacier surface. With the continued worsening of climate change, Carihuairazo can disappear within five years. By the end of 2018, there was an average nationwide loss of 53% of glacier coverage. Glacier shrinkage is a natural phenomenon that has existed; however, in the last 20 years climate change has exacerbated shrinkage. These glaciers in Ecuador play a major role in the climate because they gather the atmospheric circulation from the Pacific and the humidity of the Amazon region.

Examples

See also 
 Climate

References

External links
Climate map
Description of climates of each region

Geography of Ecuador
Ecuador